Xhulia Xhindole (born 24 January 1999) is an Albanian footballer who plays as a defender for Women's National Championship club KFF Tirana AS and the Albania women's national team.

Club career
Xhindole has played for Tirana AS in Albania.

International career
Xhindole made her senior debut for Albania on 9 April 2021 as a 60th-minute substitution during a 0–0 friendly away draw against Bosnia and Herzegovina.

See also
List of Albania women's international footballers

References

External links

1999 births
Living people
Sportspeople from Lushnjë
Albanian women's footballers
Women's association football defenders
KFF Tirana AS players
Albania women's international footballers